is a Japanese racing driver.

Racing record

Complete Super GT results

‡ Half points awarded as less than 75% of race distance was completed.

Complete Formula Nippon/Super Formula results
(key) (Races in bold indicate pole position) (Races in italics indicate fastest lap)

Complete World Touring Car Championship results
(key) (Races in bold indicate pole position) (Races in italics indicate fastest lap)

Complete GP2 Series results
(key) (Races in bold indicate pole position) (Races in italics indicate fastest lap)

† Driver did not finish the race, but was classified as he completed over 90% of the race distance.

External links
 
 

1984 births
Living people
Sportspeople from Tokyo
Japanese racing drivers
German Formula Renault 2.0 drivers
Dutch Formula Renault 2.0 drivers
Formula Renault Eurocup drivers
Japanese Formula 3 Championship drivers
Super GT drivers
Formula Nippon drivers
Super Formula drivers
World Touring Car Championship drivers
GP2 Series drivers
ART Grand Prix drivers
Dandelion Racing drivers
Team Aguri drivers
Team Kunimitsu drivers
Nakajima Racing drivers
Ma-con Motorsport drivers
Fortec Motorsport drivers